Veiko Porkanen (born on 4 January 1989 in Põltsamaa) is an Estonian actor.

In 2014 he graduated from Estonian Music and Theatre Academy. Since 2014 he is an actor at Vanemuine Theatre. Besides theatre roles he has played also in several films.

Filmography

 2015: Must alpinist
 2017: Sangarid	
 2019: Johannes Pääsukese tõeline elu
 2019: Reetur (television series) 	
 2023: Kuulsuse narrid

References

Living people
1989 births
Estonian male film actors
Estonian male stage actors
Estonian male television actors
21st-century Estonian actors
Estonian Academy of Music and Theatre alumni
People from Põltsamaa